Princess Sirivannavari Nariratana Rajakanya (born 8 January 1987) is a Princess of the Kingdom of Thailand and is the only daughter of King Vajiralongkorn by his former consort Sujarinee Vivacharawongse (commonly known as Yuvadhida Polpraserth). She is also the only one of their common children in the line of succession and to bear royal titles. She has produced works as a fashion designer, and competed in sports as an equestrian and badminton player.

Early life and education 
Sirivannavari was born Mom Chao Busyanambejra Mahidol, but later changed to Mom Chao Chakkrityapha Mahidol, and once again to Mom Chao Sirivanvari Mahidol upon order of Queen Sirikit. She has four full siblings. Following her parents' divorce, her mother moved with her siblings to the United Kingdom; her father then ordered Sirivannavari's abduction and return to Thailand.

Sirivannavari graduated with a Bachelor of Arts degree from Chulalongkorn University and a master's in design from École de la Chambre Syndicale de la couture Parisienne. She was elevated to Princess status by royal command of her grandfather, King Bhumibol Adulyadej, on 15 June 2005.

Personal life 

Sirivannavari represented Thailand in badminton at the 2005 Southeast Asian Games in the Philippines, winning a team gold. In this, she follows in the footsteps of her grandfather, King Bhumibol Adulyadej, who represented his country in international sailing events. A badminton tournament that made its debut in 2016, the Thailand Masters, bears her name.

In 2007, Sirivannavari was invited by Pierre Balmain, the French couturier, to present her fashion show in Paris. Her debut Paris collection was titled Presence of the Past, which drew on memories of her royal grandmother as well as giving a modern interpretation to traditional Thai costume. The following year, she presented her own fashion show in Paris. She designed a dress worn by the Thai entrant in the Miss Universe Thailand 2018 pageant. YouTube personality Wanchaleom Jamneanphol, known online as Mixy Bigmouth, was subsequently threatened with prosecution under Thailand's lèse-majesté laws after describing the dress as ugly.

Sirivannavari began riding horses at age nine. She trained in France at the International Moniteur d'Equitation, Le Cadre Noir de Saumur. She competed as a member of the Thai equestrian sports team in the 2013 and 2017 SEA Games.

In 2008, Sirivannavari was included as 16th on the list of the "20 Hottest Young Royals", compiled by Forbes.

Honorary degrees 

 Chulalongkorn University – honorary Doctorate in Fine and Applied Arts, in recognition of her design skill, advocacy of Thai craftsmanship, and her high-end fashion brand, Sirivannavari.

Symbols

Ancestry

Notes

References

See also 
 Badminton at the 2005 Southeast Asian Games

1987 births
Living people
People from Bangkok
Thai female Phra Ong Chao
Mahidol family
Thai female badminton players
Thai female equestrians
Thai dressage riders
Thai fashion designers
Thai people of Mon descent
Knights Grand Cordon of the Order of Chula Chom Klao
Dames Grand Cross of the Order of the Direkgunabhorn
Chulalongkorn University alumni
Badminton players at the 2006 Asian Games
Equestrians at the 2014 Asian Games
Asian Games competitors for Thailand
Competitors at the 2005 Southeast Asian Games
Competitors at the 2007 Southeast Asian Games
Competitors at the 2017 Southeast Asian Games
Sirivannavari Nariratana
Sirivannavari Nariratana
Sirivannavari Nariratana
Southeast Asian Games medalists in badminton
Southeast Asian Games medalists in equestrian
Thai female Chao Fa
Thai female Mom Chao
Thai women fashion designers
Children of Vajiralongkorn
20th-century Chakri dynasty
21st-century Chakri dynasty
Daughters of kings